The women's singles competition at the 2007 Sony Ericsson Open was won by 13th-seeded and former world number one Serena Williams, who beat the second seed Justine Henin 0–6, 7–5, 6–3, to win the title. Enroute to victory, she saved two championship points in the final after being down 0-6, 4-5 15-40.

Seeds
All seeds received a bye into the second round.

  Maria Sharapova (fourth round)
  Justine Henin  (finals)
  Svetlana Kuznetsova (fourth round)
  Kim Clijsters (fourth round)
  Martina Hingis (third round)
  Nadia Petrova (quarterfinals)
  Jelena Janković (third round)
  Nicole Vaidišová (quarterfinals)
  Anna Chakvetadze (semifinals)
  Dinara Safina (fourth round)
  Patty Schnyder (second round)
  Ana Ivanovic (second round)
  Serena Williams (champion)
  Shahar Pe'er (semifinals)
  Li Na (quarterfinals)
  Daniela Hantuchová (third round)
  Tatiana Golovin (third round)
  Vera Zvonareva (fourth round)
  Francesca Schiavone (second round)
  Katarina Srebotnik (third round)
  Marion Bartoli (second round)
  Ai Sugiyama (third round)
  Lucie Šafářová (third round)
  Tathiana Garbin (quarterfinals)
  Samantha Stosur (third round)
  Anabel Medina Garrigues (second round)
  Zheng Jie (second round)
  Alona Bondarenko (second round)
  Maria Kirilenko (second round)
  Séverine Brémond (second round)
  Martina Müller (second round)
  Mara Santangelo (fourth round)

Draw

Finals

Top half

Section 1

Section 2

Section 3

Section 4

Bottom half

Section 5

Section 6

Section 7

Section 8

References
Draw

2007 Sony Ericsson Open
Sony Ericsson Open